Hemimarginula dentigera is a species of sea snail, a marine gastropod mollusk in the family Fissurellidae, the keyhole limpets and slit limpets.

Distribution
This species occurs in the following locations:
 Aruba
 Bonaire
 Caribbean Sea
 Curaçao
 Gulf of Mexico
 Venezuela

References

External links
 To World Register of Marine Species

Fissurellidae
Gastropods described in 1889